Mohammed Hussain Awad Al-Juboori was a political party member of the Iraqi National Dialogue Council that is a moderate Sunni block. He was a representative of this block at the National Assembly of Iraq. On 12 April 2007, he was killed in the Green Zone at the convention center canteen of the parliament building in Baghdad, Iraq, in the 2007 Iraqi Parliament Bombing.

References

2007 deaths
Assassinated Iraqi politicians
Iraqi National Dialogue Council politicians
Iraqi Sunni Muslims
Iraqi terrorism victims
Members of the Council of Representatives of Iraq
Terrorism deaths in Iraq
Year of birth missing